This is a list ranking the 32 federal states in Mexico by fertility rate in 2013 and 2016.

See also
 Mexico
 States of Mexico
 Geography of Mexico
 List of Mexican states by area
 List of Mexican states by population
 List of Mexican states by population growth rate
 Ranked list of Mexican states
 Demographics of Mexico

References

Fertility rate
Fertility
Demographics of Mexico
Mexico, fertility